Elariz Mammadoghlu (Azerbaijani: Elariz Məmmədoğlu) (born 17 December 1964, Baku) is an Azerbaijani singer.

Personal life
Elariz Mammadoghlu was born on 17 December 1964. He attended Huseyn Javid Secondary School #132, and was a soloist in the choir. In 1982, he joined the faculty of directing the Mirzagha Aliyev State Art Institute. From a period of 1983 to 1985, he sang in military bases in Leningrad, Petrozavodsk, and Murmansk.

Career
Elariz started composing songs since he was 7 years old, but started performing when he was 16. From 1992 to 1994, he performed as a musician, and has continued to sing from 1994 on. He began professional singing in 1997. He is a lyrical tenor and has an extensive repertoire. Elariz also sings in the folk pop genre, and is able to sing in multiple languages.

In 2018, he won a green card lottery and moved to the US, where he works as a singer in Baku restaurant.

Discography
2000:
Devuşka v pesoçnom sarafane
Tup-Tup
2001:
Dans-Dans
2002:
Abşeron torpağı
2003:
Guya
Doroqa

Filmography
Bir dəfə Qafqazda (film, 2007)
Kişiləri qoruyun (film, 2006)
Qış nağılı. I film (film, 2002)
Məhəllə (film, 2003)
Məşədi İbad-94 (film, 2005)
"Moskva-Bakı" qatarı (film, 2005)
Oyunçu (film, 2008)
Yanmış körpülər (film, 2003)

References

21st-century Azerbaijani male singers
1964 births
Living people
Musicians from Baku